Khoosab Anjarak is a village in Tamin Rural District, in the Central District of Zahedan County, Sistan and Baluchestan Province, Iran. At the 2006 census, its population was 47, in 11 families.

References 

Populated places in Zahedan County